Hajdukovo is a village located in the Subotica municipality, in the North Bačka District of Serbia. It is situated in the autonomous province of Vojvodina. The village has a Hungarian ethnic majority and its population numbering 2,482 people (2002 census).

Historical population

1981: 2,829
1991: 2,627

See also
List of places in Serbia
List of cities, towns and villages in Vojvodina

References
Slobodan Ćurčić, Broj stanovnika Vojvodine, Novi Sad, 1996.

External links 

Hajdukovo (ADF/USAID)

Places in Bačka
Subotica
Hungarian communities in Serbia